Main page: List of Canadian plants by family

Families:
A | B | C | D | E | F | G | H | I J K | L | M | N | O | P Q | R | S | T | U V W | X Y Z

Salicaceae 

 Populus angustifolia — narrowleaf cottonwood
 Populus balsamifera — balsam poplar
 Populus deltoides — eastern cottonwood
 Populus grandidentata — largetooth aspen
 Populus heterophylla — swamp cottonwood
 Populus tremuloides — trembling aspen
 Populus x acuminata
 Populus x berolinensis
 Populus x brayshawii
 Populus x canadensis
 Populus x heimburgeri
 Populus x jackii — balm-of-Gilead
 Populus x rouleauiana
 Populus x smithii — Barnes' aspen
 Salix alaxensis — Alaska willow
 Salix amygdaloides — peach-leaved willow
 Salix arbusculoides — littletree willow
 Salix arctica — Arctic willow
 Salix arctophila — Arctic willow
 Salix argyrocarpa — northern willow
 Salix athabascensis — Athabasca willow
 Salix ballii — Ball's willow
 Salix barclayi — Barclay's willow
 Salix barrattiana — Barratt's willow
 Salix bebbiana — Bebb's willow
 Salix boothii — Booth's willow
 Salix brachycarpa — shortfruit willow
 Salix candida — hoary willow
 Salix cascadensis — Cascade willow
 Salix chamissonis — Chamisso's willow
 Salix chlorolepis — green-scaled willow
 Salix commutata — undergreen willow
 Salix cordata — sand dune willow
 Salix discolor — pussy willow
 Salix drummondiana — satiny salix
 Salix eriocephala — heart-leaved willow
 Salix exigua — narrowleaf willow
 Salix farriae — Farr's willow
 Salix fuscescens — Alaska bog willow
 Salix geyeriana — Geyer's willow
 Salix glauca — grey willow
 Salix hastata — halberd willow
 Salix herbacea — New England dwarf willow
 Salix hookeriana — Hooker's willow
 Salix humilis — prairie willow
 Salix jejuna — calcareous mat willow
 Salix lanata — lanate willow
 Salix lemmonii — Lemmon's willow
 Salix lucida — shining willow
 Salix lutea — yellow willow
 Salix maccalliana — McCall's willow
 Salix melanopsis — dusky willow
 Salix monochroma — one-colour willow
 Salix monticola — mountain willow
 Salix myricoides — blue-leaved willow
 Salix myrtillifolia — myrtle-leaf willow
 Salix nigra — black willow
 Salix nivalis — snow willow
 Salix orestera — greyleaf Sierran willow
 Salix ovalifolia — Arctic seashore willow
 Salix pedicellaris — bog willow
 Salix pedunculata — blackbract willow
 Salix pellita — satiny willow
 Salix petiolaris — meadow willow
 Salix petrophila — alpine willow
 Salix phlebophylla — skeletonleaf willow
 Salix planifolia — tea-leaved willow
 Salix polaris — polar willow
 Salix prolixa — MacKenzie's willow
 Salix pseudomonticola — false mountain willow
 Salix pyrifolia — balsam willow
 Salix raupii — Raup's willow
 Salix reticulata — net-veined willow
 Salix rotundifolia — roundleaf willow
 Salix scouleriana — Scouler's willow
 Salix sericea — silky willow
 Salix serissima — autumn willow
 Salix sessilifolia — Del Norte coast willow
 Salix setchelliana — Setchell's willow
 Salix silicicola — blanketleaf willow
 Salix sitchensis — Sitka willow
 Salix sphenophylla — wedgeleaf willow
 Salix stolonifera — creeping willow
 Salix turnorii — Turnor's willow
 Salix tweedyi — Tweedy's willow
 Salix uva-ursi — bearberry willow
 Salix vestita — rock willow
 Salix x amoena
 Salix x argusii
 Salix x beschelii
 Salix x brachypurpurea
 Salix x conifera
 Salix x cryptodonta
 Salix x dutillyi
 Salix x gaspeensis
 Salix x grayi
 Salix x jamesensis
 Salix x laurentiana
 Salix x obtusata
 Salix x paraleuca
 Salix x peasei
 Salix x pellicolor
 Salix x schneideri
 Salix x sericans
 Salix x simulans
 Salix x ungavensis
 Salix x waghornei
 Salix x wiegandii

Santalaceae 

 Comandra umbellata — umbellate bastard toadflax
 Geocaulon lividum — northern comandra

Sarraceniaceae 

 Sarracenia purpurea — purple pitcher-plant

Saururaceae 

 Saururus cernuus — lizard's-tail

Saxifragaceae 

 Boykinia occidentalis — coastal brookfoam
 Boykinia richardsonii — Richardson's brookfoam
 Chrysosplenium americanum — American golden-saxifrage
 Chrysosplenium iowense — Iowa golden-saxifrage
 Chrysosplenium rosendahlii — Rosendahl's golden-saxifrage
 Chrysosplenium tetrandrum — northern golden-carpet
 Chrysosplenium wrightii — Wright's golden-saxifrage
 Conimitella williamsii — Williams' conimitella
 Elmera racemosa — elmera
 Heuchera americana — American alumroot
 Heuchera chlorantha — greenflower alumroot
 Heuchera cylindrica — poker alumroot
 Heuchera flabellifolia — Bridger Mountain alumroot
 Heuchera glabra — alpine alumroot
 Heuchera grossulariifolia — gooseberry-leaf alumroot
 Heuchera micrantha — crevice alumroot
 Heuchera parvifolia — littleleaf alumroot
 Heuchera richardsonii — Richardson's alumroot
 Heuchera x easthamii
 Leptarrhena pyrolifolia — leatherleaf saxifrage
 Lithophragma glabrum — bulbous woodland-star
 Lithophragma parviflorum — smallflower woodland-star
 Lithophragma tenellum — slender woodland-star
 Micranthes stellaris, syn. Saxifraga stellaris — star saxifrage
 Mitella breweri — feathery bishop's-cap
 Mitella caulescens — creeping bishop's-cap
 Mitella diphylla — two-leaf bishop's-cap
 Mitella nuda — naked bishop's-cap
 Mitella ovalis — oval-leaf bishop's-cap
 Mitella pentandra — five-point bishop's-cap
 Mitella prostrata — creeping bishop's-cap
 Mitella trifida — Pacific bishop's-cap
 Parnassia fimbriata — fringed grass-of-Parnassus
 Parnassia glauca — Carolina grass-of-Parnassus
 Parnassia kotzebuei — Kotzebue's grass-of-Parnassus
 Parnassia multiseta — boreal grass-of-Parnassus
 Parnassia palustris — marsh grass-of-Parnassus
 Saxifraga adscendens — ascending saxifrage
 Saxifraga aizoides — yellow mountain saxifrage
 Saxifraga bronchialis — matte saxifrage
 Saxifraga cernua — nodding saxifrage
 Saxifraga cespitosa — tufted saxifrage
 Saxifraga eschscholtzii — cushion saxifrage
 Saxifraga ferruginea — rusty-hair saxifrage
 Saxifraga flagellaris — spider saxifrage
 Saxifraga foliolosa — leafy saxifrage
 Saxifraga gaspensis — Gaspé saxifrage
 Saxifraga hieracifolia — stiffstem saxifrage
 Saxifraga hirculus — yellow marsh saxifrage
 Saxifraga hyperborea — pygmy saxifrage
 Saxifraga integrifolia — northwestern saxifrage
 Saxifraga lyallii — redstem saxifrage
 Saxifraga mertensiana — Mertens' saxifrage
 Saxifraga nelsoniana — heartleaf saxifrage
 Saxifraga nidifica — peak saxifrage
 Saxifraga nivalis — snow saxifrage
 Saxifraga occidentalis — western saxifrage
 Saxifraga odontoloma — streambank saxifrage
 Saxifraga oppositifolia — purple mountain saxifrage
 Saxifraga oregana — bog saxifrage
 Saxifraga paniculata — white mountain saxifrage
 Saxifraga pensylvanica — swamp saxifrage
 Saxifraga platysepala — broadsepal saxifrage
 Saxifraga razshivinii — Razshivin's saxifrage
 Saxifraga redofskii — many-flower saxifrage
 Saxifraga reflexa — Yukon saxifrage
 Saxifraga rhomboidea — diamondleaf saxifrage
 Saxifraga rivularis — alpine brook saxifrage
 Saxifraga rufidula — redwool saxifrage
 Saxifraga rufopilosa — redhair saxifrage
 Saxifraga serpyllifolia — thyme-leaf saxifrage
 Saxifraga sibirica — Siberian saxifrage
 Saxifraga spicata — spiked saxifrage
 Saxifraga taylorii — Taylor's saxifrage
 Saxifraga tenuis — Ottertail Pass saxifrage
 Saxifraga tolmiei — Tolmie's saxifrage
 Saxifraga tricuspidata — prickly saxifrage
 Saxifraga virginiensis — Virginia saxifrage
 Saxifraga x geum
 Suksdorfia ranunculifolia — buttercup-leaf suksdorfia
 Suksdorfia violacea — violet suksdorfia
 Telesonix heucheriformis — false saxifrage
 Tellima grandiflora — large fringe-cup
 Tiarella cordifolia — heartleaf foamflower
 Tiarella trifoliata — lace foamflower
 Tolmiea menziesii — piggyback plant

Scapaniaceae 

 Diplophyllum albicans
 Diplophyllum apiculatum
 Diplophyllum imbricatum
 Diplophyllum microdontum
 Diplophyllum obtusatum
 Diplophyllum obtusifolium
 Diplophyllum taxifolium
 Scapania americana
 Scapania apiculata
 Scapania brevicaulis
 Scapania carinthiaca
 Scapania crassiretis
 Scapania curta
 Scapania cuspiduligera
 Scapania degenii
 Scapania glaucocephala
 Scapania gymnostomophila
 Scapania hyperborea
 Scapania irrigua
 Scapania ligulifolia
 Scapania massalongi
 Scapania mucronata
 Scapania nemorosa
 Scapania obcordata
 Scapania obscura
 Scapania paludicola
 Scapania paludosa
 Scapania parvifolia
 Scapania scandica
 Scapania simmonsii
 Scapania spitzbergensis
 Scapania subalpina
 Scapania uliginosa
 Scapania umbrosa
 Scapania undulata

Scheuchzeriaceae 

 Scheuchzeria palustris — pod grass

Schistostegaceae 

 Schistostega pennata — luminous moss

Schizaeaceae 

 Schizaea pusilla — curly-grass fern

Scouleriaceae 

 Scouleria aquatica
 Scouleria marginata

Scrophulariaceae 

 Agalinis aspera — rough purple false foxglove
 Agalinis gattingeri — roundstem false foxglove
 Agalinis maritima — saltmarsh false foxglove
 Agalinis neoscotica — Nova Scotia false foxglove
 Agalinis paupercula — smallflower false foxglove
 Agalinis purpurea — large-purple false foxglove
 Agalinis skinneriana — pale false foxglove
 Agalinis tenuifolia — slender false foxglove
 Aureolaria flava — smooth yellow false foxglove
 Aureolaria pedicularia — fernleaf yellow false foxglove
 Aureolaria virginica — downy false foxglove
 Bacopa rotundifolia — roundleaf water-hyssop
 Bartsia alpina — alpine bartsia
 Besseya wyomingensis — Wyoming coral-drops
 Buchnera americana — bluehearts
 Castilleja ambigua — paintbrush owl's-clover
 Castilleja angustifolia — northwestern Indian-paintbrush
 Castilleja annua — annual Indian-paintbrush
 Castilleja attenuata — narrowleaf owl's-clover
 Castilleja caudata — Port Clarence Indian-paintbrush
 Castilleja cervina — deer Indian-paintbrush
 Castilleja coccinea — scarlet Indian-paintbrush
 Castilleja cusickii — Cusick's Indian-paintbrush
 Castilleja elegans — elegant Indian-paintbrush
 Castilleja elmeri — Elmer's Indian-paintbrush
 Castilleja fulva — Elko Indian-paintbrush
 Castilleja hispida — harsh Indian-paintbrush
 Castilleja hyetophila — coastal red Indian-paintbrush
 Castilleja hyperborea — northern Indian-paintbrush
 Castilleja levisecta — golden paintbrush
 Castilleja lutescens — stiff yellow Indian-paintbrush
 Castilleja miniata — greater red Indian-paintbrush
 Castilleja minor — smallflower Indian-paintbrush
 Castilleja occidentalis — western Indian-paintbrush
 Castilleja pallescens — pallid Indian-paintbrush
 Castilleja parviflora — small-flowered Indian-paintbrush
 Castilleja raupii — Raup's Indian-paintbrush
 Castilleja rhexiifolia — rhexia-leaf Indian-paintbrush
 Castilleja rupicola — cliff Indian-paintbrush
 Castilleja septentrionalis — Labrador Indian-paintbrush
 Castilleja sessiliflora — downy Indian-paintbrush
 Castilleja sulphurea — sulphur Indian-paintbrush
 Castilleja tenuis — hairy owl's-clover
 Castilleja thompsonii — Thompson's Indian-paintbrush
 Castilleja unalaschcensis — Alaska Indian-paintbrush
 Castilleja yukonis — Yukon Indian-paintbrush
 Chelone glabra — white turtlehead
 Collinsia grandiflora — giant blue-eyed mary
 Collinsia parviflora — small-flowered blue-eyed mary
 Collinsia verna — spring blue-eyed mary
 Euphrasia frigida — cold-weather eyebright
 Euphrasia hudsoniana — Hudson's eyebright
 Euphrasia nemorosa — common eyebright
 Euphrasia oakesii — Oakes' eyebright
 Euphrasia randii — small eyebright
 Euphrasia subarctica — Arctic eyebright
 Euphrasia suborbicularis — roundleaf eyebright
 Euphrasia vinacea — glacier eyebright
 Euphrasia x aequalis
 Euphrasia x vestita
 Euphrasia x villosa
 Gratiola aurea — golden hedge-hyssop
 Gratiola ebracteata — bractless hedge-hyssop
 Gratiola neglecta — clammy hedge-hyssop
 Lagotis minor — little weaselsnout
 Leucospora multifida — cliff conobea
 Limosella aquatica — northern mudwort
 Limosella australis — mudwort
 Lindernia dubia — yellowseed false pimpernel
 Melampyrum lineare — American cow-wheat
 Mimetanthe pilosa — false monkeyflower
 Mimulus alatus — sharpwing monkeyflower
 Mimulus alsinoides — chickweed monkeyflower
 Mimulus breviflorus — shortflower monkeyflower
 Mimulus breweri — Brewer's monkeyflower
 Mimulus cardinalis — scarlet monkeyflower
 Mimulus dentatus — toothleaf monkeyflower
 Mimulus floribundus — floriferous monkeyflower
 Mimulus glabratus — roundleaf monkeyflower
 Mimulus guttatus — common large monkeyflower
 Mimulus lewisii — Lewis' monkeyflower
 Mimulus moschatus — muskflower
 Mimulus ringens — squarestem monkeyflower
 Mimulus tilingii — subalpine monkeyflower
 Nothochelone nemorosa — woodland beardtongue
 Nuttallanthus canadensis — old-field toadflax
 Nuttallanthus texanus — Texas toadflax
 Orthocarpus barbatus — Grand Coules owl's-clover
 Orthocarpus bracteosus — rosy owl's-clover
 Orthocarpus imbricatus — mountain owl's-clover
 Orthocarpus luteus — yellow owl's-clover
 Orthocarpus tenuifolius — goldtongue
 Pedicularis bracteosa — Canadian lousewort
 Pedicularis canadensis — early wood lousewort
 Pedicularis capitata — capitate lousewort
 Pedicularis contorta — curvebeak lousewort
 Pedicularis flammea — redtip lousewort
 Pedicularis furbishiae — Furbish's lousewort
 Pedicularis groenlandica — bull elephant's-head
 Pedicularis hirsuta — hairy lousewort
 Pedicularis labradorica — Labrador lousewort
 Pedicularis lanata — woolly lousewort
 Pedicularis lanceolata — swamp lousewort
 Pedicularis langsdorfii — Langsdorf's lousewort
 Pedicularis lapponica — northern lousewort
 Pedicularis macrodonta — muskeg lousewort
 Pedicularis oederi — Öder's lousewort
 Pedicularis ornithorhyncha — bird's-beak lousewort
 Pedicularis palustris — purple lousewort
 Pedicularis parviflora — smallflower lousewort
 Pedicularis racemosa — leafy lousewort
 Pedicularis sudetica — sudetic lousewort
 Pedicularis verticillata — whorled lousewort
 Penstemon albertinus — Alberta beardtongue
 Penstemon albidus — whiteflower beardtongue
 Penstemon attenuatus — taperleaf beardtongue
 Penstemon confertus — yellow beardtongue
 Penstemon davidsonii — creeping beardtongue
 Penstemon digitalis — foxglove beardtongue
 Penstemon ellipticus — eggleaf beardtongue
 Penstemon eriantherus — crested-tongue beardtongue
 Penstemon fruticosus — shrubby beardtongue
 Penstemon gormanii — Gorman's beardtongue
 Penstemon gracilis — slender beardtongue
 Penstemon hirsutus — hairy beardtongue
 Penstemon laevigatus — smooth beardtongue
 Penstemon lyallii — Lyall's beardtongue
 Penstemon nitidus — waxleaf beardtongue
 Penstemon ovatus — broadleaf beardtongue
 Penstemon procerus — smallflower beardtongue
 Penstemon pruinosus — Chelan beardtongue
 Penstemon richardsonii — Richardson's beardtongue
 Penstemon serrulatus — Cascade beardtongue
 Rhinanthus minor — little yellow-rattle
 Scrophularia lanceolata — hare figwort
 Scrophularia marilandica — Carpenter's square figwort
 Scrophularia oregana — Oregon figwort
 Synthyris borealis — Alaska kittentail
 Tonella tenella — smallflower tonella
 Triphysaria eriantha — Jonny-Turk owl's-clover
 Triphysaria pusilla — dwarf owl's-clover
 Triphysaria versicolor — yellowbeak false owl's-clover
 Veronica alpina — alpine speedwell
 Veronica americana — American speedwell
 Veronica anagallis-aquatica — brook-pimpernel
 Veronica cusickii — Cusick's speedwell
 Veronica officinalis — gypsyweed
 Veronica peregrina — purslane speedwell
 Veronica scutellata — marsh speedwell
 Veronica serpyllifolia — thyme-leaf speedwell
 Veronica wormskjoldii — Wormskjold's alpine speedwell
 Veronicastrum virginicum — culver's-root

Selaginellaceae 

 Selaginella densa — dense spikemoss
 Selaginella eclipes — hidden spikemoss
 Selaginella oregana — Oregon spikemoss
 Selaginella rupestris — ledge spikemoss
 Selaginella selaginoides — low spikemoss
 Selaginella sibirica — northern spikemoss
 Selaginella wallacei — Wallace's spikemoss

Seligeriaceae 

 Blindia acuta
 Brachydontium olympicum
 Seligeria acutifolia
 Seligeria brevifolia
 Seligeria calcarea
 Seligeria campylopoda
 Seligeria careyana
 Seligeria diversifolia
 Seligeria donniana
 Seligeria oelandica
 Seligeria polaris
 Seligeria pusilla
 Seligeria recurvata
 Seligeria subimmersa
 Seligeria tristichoides

Sematophyllaceae 

 Brotherella recurvans
 Brotherella roellii
 Heterophyllium affine
 Sematophyllum adnatum
 Sematophyllum demissum
 Sematophyllum marylandicum
 Wijkia carlottae

Smilacaceae 

 Smilax ecirrata — upright greenbrier
 Smilax herbacea — smooth herbaceous greenbrier
 Smilax illinoensis — Illinois greenbrier
 Smilax lasioneura — herbaceous greenbrier
 Smilax rotundifolia — common greenbrier
 Smilax tamnoides — halberd-leaf greenbrier

Solanaceae 

 Leucophysalis grandiflora — large-flowered ground-cherry
 Nicotiana attenuata — coyote tobacco
 Physalis heterophylla — clammy ground-cherry
 Physalis longifolia — longleaf ground-cherry
 Physalis virginiana — Virginia ground-cherry
 Solanum americanum — American nightshade
 Solanum ptychanthum — black nightshade
 Solanum triflorum — cutleaf nightshade

Sparganiaceae 

 Sparganium americanum — American bur-reed
 Sparganium androcladum — branching bur-reed
 Sparganium angustifolium — narrowleaf bur-reed
 Sparganium erectum — simplestem bur-reed
 Sparganium eurycarpum — large bur-reed
 Sparganium fluctuans — floating bur-reed
 Sparganium glomeratum — northern bur-reed
 Sparganium hyperboreum — boreal bur-reed
 Sparganium natans — small bur-reed

Sphagnaceae 

 Sphagnum affine
 Sphagnum andersonianum
 Sphagnum angermanicum
 Sphagnum angustifolium — narrowleaf peatmoss
 Sphagnum annulatum
 Sphagnum aongstroemii
 Sphagnum arcticum
 Sphagnum balticum
 Sphagnum bartlettianum — Bartlett's peatmoss
 Sphagnum capillifolium — northern peatmoss
 Sphagnum centrale
 Sphagnum compactum — low peatmoss
 Sphagnum contortum
 Sphagnum cuspidatum — toothed peatmoss
 Sphagnum fallax — flat-top peatmoss
 Sphagnum fimbriatum — fringed bog moss
 Sphagnum flavicomans
 Sphagnum flexuosum — flexuous peatmoss
 Sphagnum fuscum — brown peatmoss
 Sphagnum girgensohnii — Girgensohn's peatmoss
 Sphagnum henryense — Henry's peatmoss
 Sphagnum inundatum
 Sphagnum jensenii
 Sphagnum junghuhnianum
 Sphagnum lenense
 Sphagnum lescurii — yellow peatmoss
 Sphagnum lindbergii
 Sphagnum macrophyllum
 Sphagnum magellanicum — Magellan's peatmoss
 Sphagnum majus — greater peatmoss
 Sphagnum mendocinum — Mendocino peatmoss
 Sphagnum molle
 Sphagnum nitidum
 Sphagnum obtusum
 Sphagnum orientale
 Sphagnum pacificum — Pacific peatmoss
 Sphagnum palustre — prairie peatmoss
 Sphagnum papillosum — papillose peatmoss
 Sphagnum platyphyllum
 Sphagnum pulchrum — beautiful peatmoss
 Sphagnum pylaesii — simple peatmoss
 Sphagnum quinquefarium — five-ranked bogmoss
 Sphagnum recurvum — recurved peatmoss
 Sphagnum riparium
 Sphagnum rubellum — red peatmoss
 Sphagnum rubiginosum
 Sphagnum russowii — Russow's peatmoss
 Sphagnum schofieldii
 Sphagnum splendens
 Sphagnum squarrosum
 Sphagnum steerei
 Sphagnum strictum
 Sphagnum subnitens
 Sphagnum subobesum
 Sphagnum subsecundum — orange peatmoss
 Sphagnum subtile
 Sphagnum tenellum — delicate peatmoss
 Sphagnum tenerum
 Sphagnum teres
 Sphagnum torreyanum — giant peatmoss
 Sphagnum warnstorfii — fen peatmoss
 Sphagnum wilfii
 Sphagnum wulfianum — Wulf's peatmoss

Splachnaceae 

 Aplodon wormskjoldii
 Splachnum ampullaceum
 Splachnum luteum
 Splachnum pennsylvanicum — southern dung moss
 Splachnum rubrum
 Splachnum sphaericum
 Splachnum vasculosum
 Tayloria acuminata
 Tayloria froelichiana
 Tayloria hornschuchii
 Tayloria ligulata
 Tayloria serrata
 Tayloria splachnoides
 Tetraplodon angustatus
 Tetraplodon mnioides
 Tetraplodon pallidus
 Tetraplodon paradoxus
 Tetraplodon urceolatus
 Voitia nivalis

Staphyleaceae 

 Staphylea trifolia — American bladdernut

References 

Canada,family,S